Sled Storm may refer to:
 Sled Storm (1999 video game), for PlayStation
 Sled Storm (2002 video game), for PlayStation 2